is a passenger railway station in located in the city of Kaizuka, Osaka Prefecture, Japan, operated by West Japan Railway Company (JR West).

Lines

Station layout
The station consists of two island platforms connected to the station building by an underground passage. The station is staffed.

Platforms

History
It was renamed to its present name on 1 August 1941. With the privatization of the Japan National Railways (JNR) on 1 April 1987, the station came under the aegis of the West Japan Railway Company.

Station numbering was introduced in March 2018 with Higashi-Kaizuka being assigned station number JR-R41.

Passenger statistics
In fiscal 2019, the station was used by an average of 2525 passengers daily (boarding passengers only).

Surrounding area
 Japan Life Baseball Club Ground
 Kaizuka City History Exhibition Hall (former Unitika Phoenix Factory Office)
 Kaizuka Municipal Second Junior High School

See also
List of railway stations in Japan

References

External links

 Higashi-Kaizuka Station Official Site

Railway stations in Osaka Prefecture
Railway stations in Japan opened in 1934
Kaizuka, Osaka